Megan Catherine Delehanty (born March 24, 1968 in Edmonton, Alberta) is a Canadian rower. She won a gold medal at the 1992 Summer Olympics in Barcelona, in coxed eight.

References

External links

1968 births
Living people
Canadian female rowers
Medalists at the 1992 Summer Olympics
Olympic rowers of Canada
Olympic gold medalists for Canada
Olympic medalists in rowing
Rowers at the 1992 Summer Olympics
Sportspeople from Edmonton
20th-century Canadian women